The government of Albuquerque is the government of Albuquerque, New Mexico as defined by its charter. The city has a mayor-council government, divided into an executive branch headed by the Mayor and the nine-member City Council which holds the legislative authority.

Organization

Mayor 

The Mayor of Albuquerque holds a full-time paid elected position with a four-year term. Elections for Mayor are nonpartisan. The current mayor is Tim Keller, who was elected in 2017.

Each year, the Mayor submits a city budget proposal for the year to the Council by April 1, and the Council must act on the proposal within sixty days.

City Council 
The Albuquerque City Council is the elected legislative authority of the city. The Council has the power to adopt all ordinances, resolutions, or other legislation. Ordinances and resolutions passed by the Council are presented to the Mayor for his approval. If the Mayor vetoes an item, the Council can override the veto with a vote of two-thirds of the membership of the Council.

It consists of 9 members, elected from respective districts of the city on a nonpartisan basis. Members hold part-time paid positions and are elected from the nine districts for four-year terms, with four or five Councilors elected every two years. Each December, a new Council President and Vice-President are chosen by members of the Council.

The Council meets two times a month, with meetings held in the Vincent E. Griego Council Chambers in the basement level of Albuquerque/Bernalillo County Government Center in Downtown Albuquerque.

Police Department 
The Albuquerque Police Department (APD) is the police department with jurisdiction within the city limits, with anything outside of the city limits being considered the unincorporated area of Bernalillo County and policed by the Bernalillo County Sheriff's Department. It is the largest municipal police department in New Mexico, and in September 2008 the US Department of Justice recorded the APD as the 49th largest police department in the United States.

See also 
 Government of New Mexico

References

External links 
 
 Charter and Code of Ordinances (Revised Ordinances) from American Legal Publishing